Shavarsh Vladimiri (Vladimirovich) Karapetyan (born May 19, 1953) is a retired Armenian finswimmer, best known for saving the lives of 30 people in a 1976 incident in Yerevan.

Biography
Karapetyan was born on May 19, 1953, in Armenia's third largest city of Kirovakan (now called Vanadzor), then part of the Soviet Union. His family moved to Yerevan in 1964, where Shavarsh finished eight years of school and then attended a technical school for auto-mechanics. On the advice of family friends, he started to learn swimming at a young age. He later switched to finswimming. In 1975–1976, Karapetyan served in a Soviet Air Defence Forces base in the Baku military district.

1976 trolleybus incident

Karapetyan is a Merited Master of Sports of the USSR and a ten-time World Record-breaker in finswimming. He became well known in the former USSR for an act of heroism in which he rescued several people from drowning. On September 16, 1976, while jogging alongside Yerevan Lake with his brother Kamo, also a finswimmer, Karapetyan had just completed his usual distance of  when he heard the sound of a crash and saw a sinking trolleybus which had lost control and fallen from a dam wall.

The trolleybus lay at the bottom of the reservoir some 25 metres (80 ft) offshore at a depth of 10 metres (33 ft). Karapetyan swam to it and, despite conditions of almost zero visibility due to the silt rising from the bottom, broke the back window with his legs. The trolleybus carried 92 passengers.  Karapetyan pulled people up from the bottom of the lake to his waiting brother.

The combined effect of multiple lacerations from glass shards led to Karapetyan's hospitalization for 45 days, as he developed pneumonia and sepsis. Subsequent lung complications prevented Karapetyan from continuing his sports career.

Karapetyan's achievement was not immediately recognized. All related photos were kept at the district attorney's office and were only published two years later. He was awarded the Medal "For the Salvation of the Drowning" and the Order of the Badge of Honor. He became a household name in the USSR on October 12, 1982, when Komsomolskaya Pravda published the article on his feat, entitled "The Underwater Battle of the Champion". This publication revealed that he was the rescuer; and he received about 60,000 letters.

1985 burning building incident
On February 19, 1985, Shavarsh was near a burning building that had people trapped inside. He rushed in and started pulling people out. Once again, he was badly hurt (severe burns) and spent a long time in the hospital.

Karapetyan was later awarded a UNESCO "Fair Play" award for his heroism.

The main belt asteroid 3027 Shavarsh, in 1978 discovered by Nikolai Chernykh at the Crimean Astrophysical Observatory, was named after him (approved by the MPC in September 1986).

Karapetyan moved to Moscow where he founded a shoe company called "Second Breath". He regularly visits Armenia and the Nagorno-Karabakh.

Karapetyan took part in the 2014 Winter Olympics torch relay for the second stage of the run. He was passed the torch in Moscow and carried it towards Krasnogorsk. The next day, Karapetyan carried the torch for a second time. He also stated in an interview, "I was carrying the torch for Russia and for Armenia."

See also

References

1953 births
Living people
Soviet male swimmers
Armenian male swimmers
People from Vanadzor
1976 in the Soviet Union
Finswimmers
Soviet Armenians
Honoured Masters of Sport of the USSR